The Good Place is an American fantasy comedy television series created by Michael Schur for NBC. The series focuses on Eleanor Shellstrop (Kristen Bell), a recently deceased young woman who wakes up in the afterlife and is sent by Michael (Ted Danson) to "the Good Place", a heaven-like utopia he designed, in reward for her righteous life. However, she quickly realizes that she was sent there by mistake, and she must hide her imperfect behavior, and try to be a better person. William Jackson Harper, Jameela Jamil, and Manny Jacinto co-star as other residents of the Good Place, together with D'Arcy Carden as an artificial being helping the residents. Each episode is listed as "Chapter (xx)" following the opening title sequence.

The series was first announced on August 13, 2015, as a 13-episode untitled comedy based on a pitch by Schur. The first season began airing on September 19, 2016, and concluded on January 19, 2017. On January 30, 2017, NBC renewed the series for a second season of 13 episodes, which premiered on September 20, 2017, with an hour-long premiere. The second season concluded on February 1, 2018. On November 21, 2017, NBC renewed the series for a 13-episode third season, which premiered on September 27, 2018, and concluded on January 24, 2019. On December 4, 2018, the series was renewed for a fourth and final season comprising 14 episodes, which premiered on September 26, 2019. The final episode of the series aired on January 30, 2020. 

During its run, the series was critically acclaimed and earned many awards and nominations. The show was nominated for fourteen Primetime Emmy Awards, including two for Outstanding Comedy Series. In several international territories, the show is distributed on Netflix. The first season was released on September 21, 2017, while episodes of subsequent seasons became available within 24 hours of their U.S. broadcast. DVD releases for the series were distributed by the Shout! Factory. The first season was released on DVD in region 1 on October 17, 2017, while the second and third were released on DVD on July 17, 2018, and July 30, 2019, respectively. The complete series was released on Blu-ray on May 19, 2020. On September 13, 2019, a six-episode web series, titled The Selection, was released on NBC's website, app, and YouTube channel.

Series overview

Episodes

Season 1 (2016–17)

Season 2 (2017–18)

Season 3 (2018–19)

Season 4 (2019–20)

Webisodes

The Selection
On September 13, 2019, NBC released a six-part digital series consisting of two-minute episodes. Serving as a story bridge between the third and fourth seasons, the series is set in the Bad Place, as Shawn and his demon cohorts decide which humans to send to Michael's newly formed afterlife neighborhood to thwart his benevolent plan.

Ratings

Notes

References

External links
 
 

Episodes
Lists of American sitcom episodes